Charles Julius "Chick" Tolson (May 3, 1895 – April 16, 1965) was a professional baseball player who played first base in the Major Leagues over parts of five seasons from 1925–1930, for the Chicago Cubs and Cleveland Indians.

In 144 games over five seasons, Tolson posted a .284 batting average (78-for-275) with 23 runs, 4 home runs and 45 RBIs. Defensively, he recorded a .985 fielding percentage playing every inning in the majors at first base.

External links

1895 births
1965 deaths
Major League Baseball first basemen
Baseball players from Washington, D.C.
Chicago Cubs players
Cleveland Indians players
Nashville Vols players